Giancarlo Manzoni (19 November 1938 – 14 June 2013) was an Italian racing cyclist. He rode in the 1962 Tour de France.

References

External links
 

1938 births
2013 deaths
Italian male cyclists
Place of birth missing
Cyclists from the Province of Como